Zeb-un-Nissa (Sindhi: زيب النساءُ; Death: 19 December 2019) was a Sindhi folk singer of Pakistan. She was among the leading female singers of Sindh during the period from 1960s to 1990s. She had sung hundreds of Sufi songs which were recorded by Radio Pakistan Hyderabad.

Early life and childhood 
Zeb-un-Nissa was born in Nawabshah Sindh in the house of Bachu Shaikh. Her real name was Qaim Khatoon. She did not belong to a typical family of singers or musicians, however, her mother used to sing in local marriage ceremonies and social gatherings.

Singing career 
Zeb-un-Nissa started her singing career in 1958 from Radio Pakistan Hyderabad. She took lessons of music from the renowned Sindhi singer Muhammad Juman. She had a beautiful voice. Radio Pakistan recorded numerous songs of Sufi poets in her voice. Those Sufi poets included Shah Abdul Latif Bhitai, Sachal Sarmast, Misri Shah, Manthar Faqir, Budhal Faqir and many others. A rich collection of songs sung by her are available in the music Library of Radio Pakistan. She was also popular for the marriage songs called "Sehra" or "Lada" in Sindhi. She recorded the marriage songs with renowned female singers Zarina Baloch, Amina and Rubina Qureshi. Her duets with Ustad Muhammad Juman and Ustad Muhammad Yousuf are also very popular. Pakistan Television Centre Karachi also recorded more than 50 songs in her voice along with other female singers.

Death 
Zeb-un-Nissa died on 19 December 2019 in Nawabshah. Among her five daughters and two sons, only one daughter Samina Kanwal is a singer.

References 

1939 births
20th-century Pakistani women singers
Sindhi music
People from Shaheed Benazir Abad District
Pakistani folk singers
2019 deaths
Pakistani women singers
Sindhi-language singers
21st-century Pakistani women singers
Pakistani radio personalities
Pakistani classical singers
Urdu-language singers
Performers of Sufi music